Aaron Nikolai Burkart (born 20 September 1982 in Singen, Baden-Württemberg) is a German rally driver. He is the 2010 Junior World Rally Champion.

Career 
Burkart began rallying in 2002. In 2006, he began competing in the Junior World Rally Championship (JWRC) in a Citroën C2 S1600. In Burkart's first event in the championship the 2006 Rally Catalunya, his co-driver Jörg Bastuck was killed after being hit by the Ford Fiesta of Barry Clark while changing a wheel on Burkart's car. Undeterred by these events, Burkart completed the season with another co-driver. In 2008, Burkart finished second in the JWRC standings behind fellow Citroën driver Sébastien Ogier. Burkart switched to a Suzuki Swift S1600 for the 2009 season, taking his first JWRC victory on Rally Ireland, finishing the season in third position. Burkart made his debut in a World Rally Car on 2009 Rally GB for the Citroën Junior Team, finishing in 12th. On the 2010 Rally of Turkey, Burkart won the JWRC division and also finished in tenth place overall, scoring himself a WRC point. He went on to score two further JWRC podiums and won the Junior World Rally Championship for Suzuki by four points over Citroën driver Hans Weijs, Jr. in a thrilling, down-to-the-wire battle at the final rally in Spain.

WRC results

JWRC results

PWRC results

References

External links 

 

1982 births
Living people
People from Singen
Sportspeople from Freiburg (region)
German rally drivers
World Rally Championship drivers
Racing drivers from Baden-Württemberg
Citroën Racing drivers
M-Sport drivers